In mathematics, a Lie algebra  is solvable if its derived series terminates in the zero subalgebra.

The derived series is the sequence of subalgebras

If the derived series eventually arrives at the zero subalgebra, then the Lie algebra is called solvable. The derived series for Lie algebras is analogous to the derived series for commutator subgroups in group theory, and solvable Lie algebras are analogs of solvable groups.

Any nilpotent Lie algebra is a fortiori solvable but the converse is not true. The solvable Lie algebras and the semisimple Lie algebras form two large and generally complementary classes, as is shown by the Levi decomposition. The solvable Lie algebras are precisely those that can be obtained from semidirect products, starting from 0 and adding one dimension at a time.

A maximal solvable subalgebra is called a Borel subalgebra. The largest solvable ideal of a Lie algebra is called the radical.

Characterizations 
Let  be a finite-dimensional Lie algebra over a field of characteristic . The following are equivalent.
(i)  is solvable.
(iii) There is a finite sequence of ideals  of :

(iv)  is nilpotent.
(v) For  -dimensional, there is a finite sequence of subalgebras  of :

A sequence of this type is called an elementary sequence.

This is Cartan's criterion for solvability.

Properties 

Every Lie subalgebra and quotient of a solvable Lie algebra are solvable.
Given a Lie algebra  and an ideal  in it,
The analogous statement is true for nilpotent Lie algebras provided  is contained in the center. Thus, an extension of a solvable algebra by a solvable algebra is solvable, while a central extension of a nilpotent algebra by a nilpotent algebra is nilpotent.
A solvable nonzero Lie algebra has a nonzero abelian ideal, the last nonzero term in the derived series.
A solvable Lie algebra  has a unique largest nilpotent ideal , called the nilradical, the set of all  such that  is nilpotent.

Completely solvable Lie algebras

A finite-dimensional nilpotent Lie algebra is completely solvable, and a completely solvable Lie algebra is solvable. Over an algebraically closed field a solvable Lie algebra is completely solvable, but the -dimensional real Lie algebra of the group of Euclidean isometries of the plane is solvable but not completely solvable.

Examples

Abelian Lie algebras 
Every abelian Lie algebra  is solvable by definition, since its commutator . The Lie algebra structure on a vector space  given by the trivial bracket  for any two matrices  gives another example.

Nilpotent Lie algebras 
Another class of examples comes from nilpotent Lie algebras since the adjoint representation is solvable. Some examples include the upper-diagonal matrices, such as the class of matrices of the formcalled the Lie algebra of strictly upper triangular matrices. In addition, the Lie algebra of upper diagonal matrices in  form a solvable Lie algebra. This includes matrices of the formand is denoted .

Solvable but not split-solvable 
Let  be the set of matrices on the formThen  is solvable, but not split solvable. It is isomorphic with the Lie algebra of the group of translations and rotations in the plane.

Non-example 

Solvable Lie groups

Because the term "solvable" is also used for solvable groups in group theory, there are several possible definitions of solvable Lie group. For a Lie group , there is

 termination of the usual derived series of the group  (as an abstract group);
 termination of the closures of the derived series;
 having a solvable Lie algebra

See also
Cartan's criterion
Killing form
Lie-Kolchin theorem
Solvmanifold
Dixmier mapping

Notes

External links
EoM article Lie algebra, solvable
EoM article Lie group, solvable

References

.
Jean-Pierre Serre: Complex Semisimple Lie Algebras, Springer, Berlin, 2001. 

Properties of Lie algebras